Heli Malongo Aviação e Serviços de Angola, Lda is an air charter operator headquartered in Luanda, Angola, which offers onshore and offshore flights in support of the oil industry in Angola from its base at Cabinda Airport.

Profile
At the 2008 Farnborough Air Show, Heli Malongo signed a deal with the Sikorsky Aircraft Corporation for the supply of three Sikorsky S-76C++. This marked the first time Heli Malongo had ordered Sikorsky helicopters. The airline made the purchase in order to set up Angola's first search and rescue service, allowing the company to further support the burgeoning oil industry in Angola. The three helicopters were delivered to Heli Malongo at a ceremony in Coatesville, Pennsylvania on 20 January 2011.
www.helimalongo.com

Fleet
The Heli Malongo Airways fleet consists of the following aircraft (as of August 2019):

References

Airlines of Angola
Companies based in Luanda

www.helimalongo.com